Carrum Downs Secondary College is a high school located in the Melbourne suburb of Carrum Downs in Victoria, Australia.

Established in 2004, Carrum Downs Secondary has an enrolment of approximately 929 students.

Carrum Downs Secondary College has a strong relationship with Hirakata High School in Osaka, Japan. Every year, students are given the opportunity to visit the partner school to gain cross-cultural experience.

See also
Carrum Downs, Victoria

References

Public high schools in Melbourne
Educational institutions established in 2004
2004 establishments in Australia
Buildings and structures in the City of Frankston